Antonio Ibáñez de la Riva Herrera (1635–1710) was a Spanish bishop who was Grand Inquisitor of Spain from 1709 to 1710.

Biography

Antonio Ibáñez de la Riva Herrera was born in Solares in Cantabria.  He studied at the University of Salamanca and was then ordained as a priest.  He became a canon of the Colegio Mayor de San Ildefonso and then of Málaga Cathedral. 

He became Bishop of Ceuta in 1685. On 8 Jul 1685, he was consecrated bishop by Alfonso Enríquez de Santo Tomás, Bishop of Málaga.  In 1687, he was translated, becoming Archbishop of Zaragoza.  Charles II of Spain named him President of the Council of Castile in 1690 and he held that post until 1692.  He served as Viceroy and Captain General of the Kingdom of Aragon, the first from 1693 to 1696.  He held a synod in Zaragoza in 1697.  With the outbreak of the War of the Spanish Succession in 1701, he again served as Viceroy and Captain General of Aragon; under his leadership, Aragon remained loyal to Philip V of Spain.  As Grand Inquisitor of Spain, he headed the Spanish Inquisition from 1709 to 1710.

He died in Madrid in 1710.  In 1780, his remains were transferred to La Seo Cathedral in Zaragoza.

Episcopal succession

References 

This page is based on this page on Spanish Wikipedia.

1635 births
1710 deaths
Grand Inquisitors of Spain
17th-century Roman Catholic archbishops in Spain
Archbishops of Zaragoza
University of Salamanca alumni
Bishops of Ceuta
17th-century Roman Catholic bishops in Africa